Philip Gyselaer, also Giselaer (c. 1620 – after 1650), was a Flemish painter specialized in history painting in the tradition of Willem van Herp. He was registered  at the Antwerp Guild of St. Luke as a pupil of Adriaen van Utrecht in 1634.

Only a few of his works are known. One of his works depicting Mercury and Jupiter in the House of Philemon and Baucis is in the collection of the Kunsthistorisches Museum.

Sources
J. de Maere, Jennifer A. Martin, and Marie Wabbes. Illustrated Dictionary of 17th Century Flemish Painters. Brussels: Renaissance du livre, 1994; p. 190.

References

Flemish Baroque painters
Painters from Antwerp
Flemish history painters
1620s births
1650s deaths